Thomas or Tom Davenport may refer to:

 Thomas Davenport (inventor) (1802–1851), blacksmith from Vermont, USA, inventor of the electric motor
 Thomas Davenport (congressman) (died 1838), U.S. representative from Virginia
 Thomas Davenport (footballer) (1860–?), English footballer active in the 1880s
 Thomas H. Davenport (born 1954), known as Tom, American academic
 Sir Thomas Davenport (MP), British Member of Parliament for Newton, 1780–1786
 Tom Davenport (filmmaker) (born 1939), American filmmaker